The Allan Hills are a group of hills at the end of the Transantarctic Mountains System, located in Oates Land and Victoria Land regions of Antarctica.  

They were mapped by the New Zealand party (1957–58) of the Commonwealth Trans-Antarctic Expedition and named for Professor R. S. Allan of the University of Canterbury, New Zealand.

Allan Hills is referred to as the Allan Nunatak, and mapped north of Carapace Nunatak, in the memoirs of the Scott Base Leader Adrian Hayter. Both names are in the USGS listing.

Meteorites
According to William A. Cassidy, describing the 1976–1977 ANSMET meteorite collecting season, "Looking across the Mackay Glacier at the great sky-blue patches of ice beyond Mount Brooke, we were looking for the first time at ice that had a tremendous upstream collecting area.  We were looking at Meteorite Heaven...  The closest mapped feature to the ice patch north of the Mackay Glacier was a low-lying, roughly Y-shaped ridge called Allan Hills."  During his second collecting season, Cassidy camped at what he called the Allan Hills Main Icefield, "a major concentration of meteorites," and made reconnaissance visits to nearby ice patches, Allan Hills Near Western, Allan Hills Middle Western and Allan Hills Far Western Icefields.  They collected their first lunar meteorite, ALHA 81005, during the 1981–82 field season in the Middle Western Icefield.  The Martian meteorite ALHA 77005 was collected in 1977 at Allan Hills, while ALH 84001 was collected on the Allan Hills Far Western Icefield during the 1984–85 season.

Geology
Allan Hills are in the shape of the letter "Y", with the open end pointing roughly northwards, and encompassing the Shimmering Icefield.  The southern end of the Y starts at Ballance Peak and proceeds northward, encompassing the Feistmantel Valley and Mount Watters, before it splits into the northwest Tilman Ridge and the northeast Shipton Ridge.  The Jurassic Mawson Formation outcrops from Ballance Point until where these two ridges come together, and the Permian Weller Formation outcrops.  Along the Shipton Ridge, the Triassic Feather Formation lies next to the Weller, followed by the Triassic Lashley Formation, which continues from Halle Flat and Roscolyn Tor, through Toltec Butte, until the northerly end of the ridge at Lavallee Point.  Ferrar Dolerite is exposed at Coxcomb Peak.  Along the Tilman Ridge, the Feather and Lashley formations outcrop along the ridge at Ship Cone and Townrow Peak respectively, but the Jurassic Ferrar Dolerite outcrops at Stopes Point, the end of the ridge.

See also
 Antarctic search for meteorites 
 Mars meteorite
 Mixon Rocks
 Todd Gully
 Transantarctic Mountains

References

External links
USGS topographic map of Allan Hills

Hills of Victoria Land
Hills of Oates Land
Transantarctic Mountains
Scott Coast